A bachelor is a man who is not and has never been married.

Etymology
A bachelor is first attested as the 12th-century bacheler: a knight bachelor, a knight too young or poor to gather vassals under his own banner. The Old French  presumably derives from Provençal  and Italian , but the ultimate source of the word is uncertain. The proposed Medieval Latin * ("vassal", "field hand") is only attested late enough that it may have derived from the vernacular languages, rather than from the southern French and northern Spanish Latin . Alternatively, it has been derived from Latin  ("a stick"), in reference to the wooden sticks used by knights in training.

History
From the 14th century, the term "bachelor" was also used for a junior member of a guild (otherwise known as "yeomen") or university and then for low-level ecclesiastics, as young monks and recently appointed canons. As an inferior grade of scholarship, it came to refer to one holding a "bachelor's degree".

In the Victorian era, the term "eligible bachelor" was used in the context of upper class matchmaking, denoting a young man who was not only unmarried and eligible for marriage, but also considered "eligible" in financial and social terms for the prospective bride under discussion. Also in the Victorian era, the term "confirmed bachelor" denoted a man who desired to remain single.

By the later 19th century, the term "bachelor" had acquired the general sense of "unmarried man". The expression bachelor party is recorded 1882. In 1895, a feminine equivalent "bachelor-girl" was coined, replaced in US English by "bachelorette" by the mid-1930s. This terminology is now generally seen as antiquated, and has been largely replaced by the gender-neutral term "single" (first recorded 1964). In England and Wales, the term "bachelor" remained the official term used for the purpose of marriage registration until 2005, when it was abolished in favor of "single."

Bachelors have been subject to penal laws in many countries, most notably in Ancient Sparta and Rome. At Sparta, men unmarried after a certain age were subject to various penalties (atimía): they were forbidden to watch women's gymnastics; during the winter, they were made to march naked through the agora singing a song about their dishonor; and they were not provided with the traditional respect due to the elderly. Some Athenian laws were similar.
Over time, some punishments developed into no more than a teasing game. In some parts of Germany, for instance, men who were still unmarried by their 30th birthday were made to sweep the stairs of the town hall until kissed by a "virgin". In a 1912 Pittsburgh Press article, there was a suggestion that local bachelors should wear a special pin that identified them as such, or a black necktie to symbolize that "....they [bachelors] should be in perpetual mourning because they are so foolish as to stay unmarried and deprive themselves of the comforts of a wife and home."

The idea of a tax on bachelors has existed throughout the centuries. Bachelors in Rome fell under the Lex Julia of 18 BC and the Lex Papia Poppaea of AD 9: these lay heavy fines on unmarried or childless people while providing certain privileges to those with several children. In 1695, a law known as the Marriage Duty Act was imposed on single males over 25 years old by the English Crown to help generate income for the Nine Years' War. In Britain, taxes occasionally fell heavier on bachelors than other persons: examples include 6 & 7 Will. III, the 1785 Tax on Servants, and the 1798 Income Tax. 

A study that was conducted by professor Charles Waehler at the University of Akron in Ohio on non-married heterosexual males deduced that once non-married men hit middle age, they will be less likely to marry and remain unattached later into their lives. The study concluded that there is only a 1-in-6 chance that men older than 40 will leave the single life, and that after the age 45, the odds fall to 1-in-20.

In certain Gulf Arab countries, "bachelor" can refer to men who are single as well as immigrant men married to a spouse residing in their country of origin (due to the high added cost of sponsoring a spouse onsite), and a colloquial term "executive bachelor" is also used in rental and sharing accommodation advertisements to indicate availability to white-collar bachelors in particular.

Men who never married 

Listed chronologically by date of birth.

Bachelorette 

The term bachelorette is sometimes used to refer to a woman who has never been married.

The traditional female equivalent to bachelor is spinster, which is considered pejorative and implies unattractiveness (i.e. old maid, cat lady). The term "bachelorette" has been used in its place, particularly in the context of bachelorette parties and reality TV series The Bachelorette.

See also
 Bachelor pad
 Men Going Their Own Way
 Spinster

References

External links

 Cole, David. "Note on Analyticity and the Definability of 'Bachelor'." Philosophy Department of the University of Minnesota Duluth. 1 February 1999.

Marriage
Terms for men